The 2000 Giro d'Italia was the 83rd edition of the Giro. It began with a  prologue that navigated through the Italian capital Rome. The race came to a close on June 4 with a mass-start stage that ended in the Italian city of Milan. Twenty teams entered the race that was won by the Italian Stefano Garzelli of the  team. Second and third were the Italian riders Francesco Casagrande and Gilberto Simoni.

In the race's other classifications,  rider Francesco Casagrande won the mountains classification, Dimitri Konyshev of the  team won the points classification, and  rider Fabrizio Guidi won the intergiro classification.  finished as the winners of the Trofeo Fast Team classification, ranking each of the twenty teams contesting the race by lowest cumulative time.

Teams

The race organizers RCS Sport invited twenty teams to participate in the race. Each team sent a squad of nine riders, so the Giro began with a peloton of 180 cyclists. Out of the 180 riders that started this edition of the Giro d'Italia, a total of 127 riders made it to the finish in Milan.

The teams that took part in the race were:

Pre-race favorites

Marco Pantani – who was expelled the previous year for having high levels of hematocrit – announced his intentions to race the Giro a few weeks prior to the race despite only racing a few times during the year. Francesco Casagrande was seen as a favorite because of his victory at the 1999 Tour de Suisse; however, a doping suspension, marred the rest of his season. Paolo Savoldelli was found to be in good form following an overall victory at the Tour de Romandie.

Tim Maloney of CyclingNews stated that 's Ivan Gotti, who had won the previous year's race following Pantani's disqualification, desired to prove he is a legitimate contender. He added that the young rider Danilo Di Luca will be competing in his second Giro and he will aim for a stage victory.

Sprinter Mario Cipollini, a favorite to win the stages if they come to a bunch sprint, started the race after battling asthma in the preceding weeks. Ivan Quaranta was another rider that was seen as a contender for the sprint stages, along with reigning Italian road race champion Salvatore Commesso.

Route and stages

The race route was revealed by the organizers in Milan at the Teatro Lirico. This running of the Giro contained three individual time trial events, one of which was the prologue the race began with. There were a total of ten stages that contained categorized climbs; five of which contained climbs of higher categories, while the other five stages held only categorized climbs of lesser degree. The remaining nine stages were primarily flat stages.

Of the mountain stages, three ended with summit finishes: stage 5 to Peschici, stage 9 to Abetone, and stage 18 to Prato Nevoso. One other stage had a summit arrival, the demanding stage 20 climbing time trial up the Sestriere.

The race began in Rome to celebrate the Great Jubilee, with the opening prologue passing historic sites such as the Colosseum and Imperial Forum. The race then headed down the coast to Scalea through the first week, before turning east to Matera, then heading north through Apulia, travelling along a length of the Adriatic coast.

CyclingNews writer Tim Maloney felt that the first difficult stage to be raced would be the eighth stage, which featured three major categorized climbs across  of racing.

Classification Leadership

In the 2000 Giro d'Italia, five different jerseys were awarded. For the general classification, calculated by adding each cyclist's finishing times on each stage, and allowing time bonuses for the first three finishers on mass-start stages, the leader received a pink jersey. This classification is considered the most important of the Giro d'Italia, and the winner is considered the winner of the Giro.

Additionally, there was a points classification, which awarded a mauve jersey. In the points classification, cyclists got points for finishing in the top 15 in a stage. The stage win awarded 25 points, second place awarded 20 points, third 16, fourth 14, fifth 12, sixth 10, and one point fewer per place down the line, to a single point for 15th. In addition, points could be won in intermediate sprints.

There was also a mountains classification, which awarded a green jersey. In the mountains classifications, points were won by reaching the top of a mountain before other cyclists. Each climb was categorized as either first, second, or third category, with more points available for the higher-categorized climbs. The highest point in the Giro (called the Cima Coppi), which in 2000 was Colle dell'Agnello, afforded more points than the other first-category climbs.

The fourth jersey represented the intergiro classification, marked by a blue jersey. The calculation for the intergiro is similar to that of the general classification, in each stage there is a midway point that the riders pass through a point and where their time is stopped. As the race goes on, their times compiled and the person with the lowest time is the leader of the intergiro classification and wears the blue jersey.

There were also two classifications for teams. The first was the Trofeo Fast Team. In this classification, the times of the best three cyclists per team on each stage were added; the leading team was the team with the lowest total time. The Trofeo Super Team was a team points classification, with the top 20 placed riders on each stage earning points (20 for first place, 19 for second place and so on, down to a single point for 20th) for their team.

The rows in the following table correspond to the jerseys awarded after that stage was run.

Final standings

General classification

Points classification

Mountains classification

Intergiro classification

Trofeo Fast Team classification

Trofeo Super Team classification

Minor classifications

Other less well-known classifications, whose leaders did not receive a special jersey, were awarded during the Giro. Other awards included the Bilboa most combative trophy classification, which was a compilation of points gained for position on crossing intermediate sprints, mountain passes and stage finishes. Russian Dmitri Konyshev won the most combative classification. The Top Runner Trophy Liquigas classification was won by Francesco Casagrande.

References

Citations

External links 
 Official results

 
Giro
Giro d'Italia
Giro d'Italia by year
May 2000 sports events in Europe
June 2000 sports events in Europe